Abdullah Sulaiman Zubromawi (born 15 November 1973) is a retired football defender from Saudi Arabia. Between 1993 and 2002, he played 141 international matches and scored 4 goals for the national team. He played at the World Cups in 1994, 1998 and 2002. At the club level, he played mostly for Al-Ahli and Al-Hilal in his home country.

Zubromawi also represented Saudi Arabia at the 1996 Summer Olympics.

International goals

See also
 List of men's footballers with 100 or more international caps

References

External links

1973 births
Saudi Arabian footballers
Saudi Arabia international footballers
1994 FIFA World Cup players
1995 King Fahd Cup players
1996 AFC Asian Cup players
1997 FIFA Confederations Cup players
1998 FIFA World Cup players
1999 FIFA Confederations Cup players
2002 FIFA World Cup players
AFC Asian Cup-winning players
Living people
Footballers at the 1996 Summer Olympics
Olympic footballers of Saudi Arabia
2000 AFC Asian Cup players
FIFA Century Club
Al Hilal SFC players
Al-Ahli Saudi FC players
Damac FC players
Sportspeople from Jeddah
Association football defenders
Saudi First Division League players
Saudi Professional League players
Footballers at the 1994 Asian Games
Asian Games competitors for Saudi Arabia
21st-century Saudi Arabian people
20th-century Saudi Arabian people